Zuheir al-Hiti (born 1957) is an Iraqi writer and journalist. He has published three novels: My Distant Day (2002), American Dust (2009) and Days of Dust (2016), the last of which was nominated for the Arabic Booker Prize. He has also written a work of literary criticism, The Image of the Iraqi in the Arabic Novel (2006).

References

Iraqi male writers
Living people
1957 births
Place of birth missing (living people)
Date of birth missing (living people)
Iraqi journalists
21st-century Iraqi writers